Deady is a surname. Notable people with the surname include:

 Mark Deady (born 1967), American middle-distance runner
 Matthew Deady (1824–1893), American politician and jurist
 Moira Deady (1922–2010), Irish actress

See also
 Eady